Lisa Ono (小野リサ; born 29 July 1962) is a Brazilian Japanese bossa nova singer.

Life 
Lisa Ono was born in São Paulo, Brazil, in 1962 but moved with her family to Tokyo at the age of 10. From that time on she spent half of every year in Japan and half in Rio de Janeiro, Brazil.

Although she lived in Brazil for only a short time, she was turned into a type of "MPB (Brazilian popular music) ambassador" in Japan, influenced by her father, who owned a club while living in Brazil and was also Baden Powell's agent.

Lisa began singing and playing the guitar at age 15 and her debut as a professional Bossa Nova singer was in 1989. Her natural voice, rhythmic guitar playing, and her charming smile led her to a huge success and popularized Bossa Nova in Japan. She has performed with many top musicians such as Antônio Carlos Jobim and João Donato and has been performing enthusiastically in New York City, Brazil and Asian countries. The 1999 album Dream sold more than two hundred thousand copies in Japan and since then she has established a determined position in the Japanese Bossa Nova community.

She is not related to the late Beatle John Lennon's wife Yoko Ono.

Career 
After moving to Japan, Lisa's father opened a new venue called Saci-Pererê, a Brazilian restaurant where she started performing mainly bossa nova and samba.  Besides singing, Lisa Ono plays the guitar and is a songwriter. Her first album, Catupiry, was released in 1989. She has not stopped recording since then, releasing one disc a year, mostly in Portuguese. She soon became famous in Japan after appearing in several TV commercials.

In 1991 her album Nanã won the "Grand Prix Gold Disk Award for Jazz" in Japan.  Her third album Menina was recorded in Rio de Janeiro, and won the same Grand Prix award. In 1992, Ono released her second album on the BMG label called Serenata Carioca, and she also released her first book Felicidade. In 1994 she released Esperança, with guest appearances by Tom Jobim, Sivuca, Paulo Moura, Danilo Caymmi and Meerio Adnet. In 1993, she made Minha Saudade, dedicated to works by João Donato, who also wrote the arrangements. In 1996, Antonio Adolfo co-produced her CD Rio Bossa. In 1998, Ono released the album Bossa Carioca, produced by Paulo and Daniel Jobim. She also started a label, Nanã, aimed at promoting Brazilian music in Japan.

In 1999, Oscar Castro-Neves co-produced her CD Dream, which sold over 200,000 copies. This album was made in America, and contains classic American songs and film music from the 1940s–50s done with bossa nova arrangements. In July 2000, Ono continued her exploration of songs in English with the release of Pretty World, co-produced by Eumir Deodato.

In the fall of 2000 she released Boas Festas, a "winter bossa" album to celebrate the Christmas season. The album includes original tunes as well as fresh bossa arrangements of classic American Christmas carols. Continuing her exploration of new material, in the summer of 2001, Lisa released Bossa Hula Nova, which as the title name implies, includes some new and classic Hawaiian songs done in a bossa nova style. This album includes arrangements by Meerio Adnet, who appears on many of her recordings. In March 2002, Lisa released Lisa Ono Best 1997–2001. This album also includes two wonderful new live songs recorded on Lisa's "winter bossa" tour in December 2001. In July 2002, Lisa released Questa Bossa Mia (This Is My Bossa Nova). This CD features a new musical destination – Italy! Meerio Adnet is once again involved.

In 2003 she released the album Dans Mon Île (French for "In my island"), themed around a voyage to France and based on famous French songs. Joining her once again is the Brazilian composer and arranger Meerio Adnet. Guest musicians include Pierre Barouh, Richard Galliano, and Henri Salvador, who also performs a duet with Lisa on "J'ai Vu". In the summer of 2004, Lisa released NAIMA-meu anjo, a collection of African and Arabic songs done in a bossa nova style. In November 2004, Lisa released her newest CD Boas Festas 2 – Feliz Natal. On this album Lisa returns to Brazil with a new "winter bossa" collection of Christmas songs in English and Portuguese recorded with three of Brazil's top guitarists – Toninho Horta, Oscar Castro-Neves, and Romero Lubambo.

Lisa announced the birth of her second child, a boy, on 7 October 2004.

Lisa has performed with Tom Jobim and with João Donato in Brazil, in addition to other performances around the world.  Appearances in Japan include concerts at the Blue Note Tokyo with Paulo and Daniel Jobim, Toninho Horta, and Emílio Santiago.

In addition to making guest appearances on other recordings, Lisa has also created music for television commercials in Japan.

As of November 2007, she has released 22 albums.

In 2009, from January to April, Ono held her Asian tour from Beijing, Shanghai, Hong Kong, Taipei, to Bangkok. On 4 March 2009, her two new albums, Cheek To Cheek – Jazz Standards from RIO – and Look To The Rainbow – Jazz Standards from L.A. – were released at the same time. The theme of both albums is jazz music, and features producers/arrangers from Brazil (Meerio Adnet) and Los Angeles (Bill Cantos). In May 2009, Lisa started Lisa Ono Concert Tour 2009 – Jazz Standards -, a tour to celebrate her two new albums.

In August 2012, Ono served on the judging panel of a Chinese singing-survival show Asian Wave which was broadcast on Dragon Television from 5 September.

In March 2019, her song Sway It, Hula Girl from the album Bossa Hula Nova was sampled on Freddie Dredd's song Cha Cha, which subsequently became popular on the short form video app TikTok.

Discography 
 1989.10.21 – CATUPIRY（MIDI）
 1990.04.21 – NaNã
 1991.07.21 – menina （BMG）
 1992.06.21 – SERENATA CARIOCA
 1993.01.21 – Namorada
 1994.06.22 – Esperanca
 1995.04.21 – Minha Saudade
 1996.11.21 – RIO BOSSA
 1997.11.19 – ESSENCIA
 1997 – Amigos
 1998.07.16 – BOSSA CARIOCA
 1999.06.23 – DREAM
 2000.07.05 – Pretty World
 2000.11.16 – Boas Festas
 2001.07.11 – Bossa Hula Nova
 2002.07.10 – Questa Bossa Mia...
 2003.07.16 – DANS MON ILE
 2004.06.23 – NAIMA～meu anjo～
 2004.11.17 – Boas Festas2～Feliz Natal～
 2005.06.29 – Romance Latino vol.1
 2005.07.27 – Romance Latino vol.2
 2005.08.24 – Romance Latino vol.3
 2006.07.12 – Jambalaya -Bossa Americana-
 2007.07.11 – Soul & Bossa
 2007.11.21 – Music Of Antonio Carlos Jobim: Ipanema
 2009.03.04 – Cheek To Cheek -Jazz Standards from RIO
 2009.03.04 – Look To The Rainbow – Jazz Standards from L.A
 2010.03.05 – ASIA 
 2011.10.26 – Japão
 2013.06.19 – Japão2
 2014.05.21 – Brasil
 2014.09.14 – Japao 3
 2015.07.01 – My Favorite Songs
 2016.04.27 – Dancing Bossa

Collections 
 1991.11.21 – O Melhor De Lisa（MIDI）
 1997.06.28 – AMIGOS
 1998.06.24 – Selecao　（BMG）
 2000.02.23 – Colecao～the collection
 2002.03.06 – Ono Lisa Best 1997–2001　（EMI）
 2005.12.07 – Romance Latino Selection
 2008.05.21 – Ono Lisa Best 2002–2006　（EMI）
 2008.05.21 – Ono Lisa Best 1989–1996　（MIDI, BMG）
 2021.05.10 _ Lisa Ono: #BeefBeefChallenge
 2021.08.29 _ Lisa Onds!!  ( EMI )

References

External links 
 Lisa Ono Official Website
 Lisa Ono Oricon Profile
 HMV.co.jp Top 100 pops Artists
 avex Official Website (Japanese)
 Discover Lisa Ono

See also 
 Bossa nova

1962 births
Living people
English-language singers from Brazil
Bossa nova singers
21st-century Brazilian women singers
21st-century Brazilian singers
Japanese-language singers of Brazil
Brazilian musicians of Japanese descent
21st-century Japanese women singers
21st-century Japanese singers
20th-century Brazilian women singers
20th-century Brazilian singers
Singers from São Paulo
Dreamusic artists
20th-century Japanese women singers
20th-century Japanese singers
Brazilian emigrants to Japan